Celastrina huegeli, the large hedge blue, is a small butterfly found in India that belongs to the lycaenids or blues family.

Taxonomy
The alternate scientific name is Celastrina huegelii. The butterfly was earlier known as Lycaenopsis huegelii Moore.

The spelling of the species taxon name is usually found in literature as huegelii, except for the NHM's LepIndex site where it is recorded as huegeli.

The species is considered to consist of the following subspecies:
 C. h. heugelii – nominate subspecies
 C. h. singalensis – previously Lycaenopsis singalensis as per Evans and considered as Polyommatus singalensis as per NHM's LepIndex
 C. h. dipora – dusky blue Cupid previously Everes dipora as per Evans

Range
It is found in Kashmir to Kumaon in India. Markku Savela's site gives range of the butterfly as Himalayas to Sri Lanka, Myanmar, and northern Thailand, the extended range being due to the inclusion of C. h. singalensis and C. h. dipora as part of the huegelii species.

See also
List of butterflies of India
List of butterflies of India (Lycaenidae)

References

 

Celastrina
Fauna of Pakistan
Butterflies of Asia
Butterflies described in 1882